Jeremy Cockrill is a Canadian politician, who was elected to the Legislative Assembly of Saskatchewan in the 2020 Saskatchewan general election. He represents the electoral district of The Battlefords as a member of the Saskatchewan Party. On May 31, 2022, he was appointed to cabinet as Minister of Highways.

References

Living people
21st-century Canadian politicians
People from Battleford
Saskatchewan Party MLAs
Year of birth missing (living people)